Approximately 600 genera belong to the subfamily Noctuinae, cutworm or dart moths. There are more than 7,000 described species in this subfamily of Noctuidae.

Noctuinae genera

 Tribe Actinotiini Beck, 1996
 Actinotia Hübner, 1821
 Alastria Lafontaine & Troubridge, 2004
 Chloantha Boisduval, Rambur & Graslin, 1836
 Iodopepla Franclemont, 1964
 Nedra Clarke, 1940
 Tribe Apameini Guenée, 1841
 Achatodes Guenée, 1852
 Acrapex Hampson, 1894
 Afrogortyna Krüger, 1997
 Amphipoea Billberg, 1820
 Anapamea Sugi, 1982
 Antapamea Sugi, 1982
 Apamea Ochsenheimer, 1816
 Archanara Walker, 1866
 Arenostola Hampson, 1908
 Argyrospila Herrich-Schaffer, 1851
 Asidemia Sugi, 1982
 Atrachea Warren, 1911
 Benjaminiola Strand, 1928
 Buakea Moyal et al., 2011
 Calamia Hübner, 1821
 Cervyna Ronkay, Zilli & Fibiger, 2005
 Cherokeea Quinter & Sullivan, 2014
 Cobalos Smith, 1899
 Coenagria Staudinger, 1892
 Coenobia Stephens, 1850
 Crypsedra Warren, 1910
 Ctenostola Sugi, 1982
 Denticucullus Rakosy, 1996
 Eremobia Stephens, 1829
 Eremobina McDunnough, 1937
 Euros H. Edwards, 1881
 Fabula Fibiger, Zilli & Ronkay, 2005
 Franclemontia Ferguson, 1992
 Globia Fibiger, Zilli, Ronkay & Goldstein, 2010
 Gortyna Ochsenheimer, 1816
 Hampsonicola Ronkay, Zilli & Fibiger, 2010
 Helotropha Lederer, 1857
 Hydraecia Guenée, 1841
 Hydredes Volynkin & Matov, 2014
 Hypocoena Hampson, 1908
 Lateroligia Zilli, Fibiger & Ronkay, 2005
 Lemmeria Barnes & Benjamin, 1926
 Lenisa Fibiger, Zilli & Ronkay, 2005
 Litoligia Beck, 1999
 Lophocalama Hampson, 1910
 Loscopia Beck, 1991
 Luperina Boisduval, 1829
 Macronoctua Grote, 1874
 Melanapamea Lafontaine, 2009
 Meropleon Dyar, 1924
 Mesapamea Heinicke, 1959
 Mesoligia Boursin, 1965
 Minigrapta Matov & Kononenko, 2012
 Neoligia Troubridge & Lafontaine, 2002
 Nonagria Ochsenheimer, 1816
 Oligia Hübner, 1821
 Oria Hübner, 1821
 Orthomoia Mustelin, 2000
 Oxytripia Staudinger, 1871
 Papaipema Smith, 1899
 Parapamea Bird, 1927
 Peraniana Strand, 1942
 Photedes Lederer, 1857
 Phragmatiphila Hampson, 1908
 Protapamea Quinter, 2009
 Protarchanara Beck, 1999
 Pseudluperina Beck, 1999
 Resapamea Varga & Ronkay, 1992
 Rhizedra Warren, 1911
 Rotoa Strand, 1942
 Sedina Urbahn, 1933
 Sesamia Guenée, 1852
 Staurophora Reichenbach, 1817
 Unchelea Fibiger, Zilli & Ronkay, 2010
 Virgo Staudinger, 1892
 Xenapamea Sugi, 1970
 Xylomoia Staudinger, 1892
 Tribe Arzamini Grote, 1883
 Bellura Walker, 1865
 Tribe Caradrinini Boisduval, 1840
 Subtribe Athetiina Fibiger & Lafontaine, 2005
 Anorthodes Smith, 1891
 Athetis Hübner, 1821
 Proxenus Herrich-Schäffer, 1850
 Subtribe Caradrinina Boisduval, 1840
 Caradrina Ochsenheimer, 1816
 Charanyca Billberg, 1820
 Chilodes Herrich-Schäffer, 1849
 Hoplodrina Boursin, 1937
 Protoperigea McDunnough, 1937
 Rusina Stephens, 1829
 Stenodrina Boursin, 1937
 Not assigned to a subtribe
 Atypha Hübner, 1821
 Diadochia Püngeler, 1914
 Stygiodrina Boursin, 1937
 Tribe Dypterygiini Forbes, 1954
 Acroria Walker, 1858
 Anthracia Hübner, 1823
 Callyna Guenée, 1852
 Colocasidia Sugi, 1982
 Dypterygia Stephens, 1829
 Eremotrachea Hacker, 2001
 Feliniopsis Roepke, 1938
 Heterophysa Boursin, 1953
 Leucotrachea Janse, 1937
 Leumicamia Viette, 1965
 Magusa Walker, 1857
 Mimleucania Hampson, 1909
 Mormo Ochsenheimer, 1816
 Neophaenis Hampson, 1908
 Olivenebula Kishida & Yoshimoto, 1977
 Polyphaenis Boisduval, 1840
 Sasunaga Moore, 1881
 Stenopterygia Hampson, 1908
 Thalpophila Hübner, 1820
 Trachea Ochsenheimer, 1816
 Triphaenopsis Butler, 1878
 Tribe Elaphriini Beck, 1996
 Bryolymnia Hampson, 1908
 Chytonix Grote, 1874
 Elaphria Hübner, 1818
 Galgula Guenée, 1852
 Gonodes Druce, 1908
 Hampsonodes Nye, 1975
 Pseudomarimatha Ferris & Lafontaine, 2010
 Strotihypera Kononenko & Han, 2011
 Tribe Episemini
 Cleoceris Boisduval, 1836
 Leucochlaena Hampson, 1906
 Tribe Eriopygini Fibiger & Lafontaine, 2005
 Anhimella McDunnough, 1943
 Anhypotrix Lafontaine, Ferris & Walsh, 2010
 Engelhardtia Barnes & Benjamin, 1923
 Eriopyga Guenée, 1852
 Eriopygodes Hampson, 1905
 Fergusonix Mustelin & Leuschner, 2000
 Hexorthodes McDunnough, 1943
 Homorthodes McDunnough, 1943
 Hydroeciodes Hampson, 1905
 Hyperepia Barnes & Lindsey, 1922
 Hypotrix Guenée, 1852
 Hyssia Guenée, 1852
 Lacinipolia McDunnough, 1937
 Lasionycta Aurivillius, 1892
 Lophoceramica Dyar, 1908
 Marilopteryx Franclemont, 1982
 Mimobarathra Barnes & McDunnough, 1915
 Miodera Smith, 1908
 Neleucania Smith, 1902
 Nudorthodes Lafontaine, Walsh & Ferris, 2014
 Orthodes Guenée, 1852
 Protorthodes McDunnough, 1943
 Psammopolia L. G. Crabo & Lafontaine, 2009
 Pseudorthodes Morrison, 1874
 Rhabdorthodes Crabo, 2018
 Synorthodes Franclemont, 1976
 Trichocerapoda Benjamin, 1932
 Trichofeltia McDunnough, 1929
 Tricholita Grote, 1875
 Trichopolia Grote, 1883
 Ulolonche Smith, 1888
 Zosteropoda Grote, 1874
 Tribe Glottulini Guenée, 1852
 Brithys Hübner, 1821
 Diaphone Hübner, 1820
 Polytela Guenée, 1852
 Polytelodes Hampson, 1905
 Xanthopastis Hübner, 1821
 Tribe Hadenini Guenée, 1837
 Afotella Barnes & Benjamin, 1925
 Anapoma Berio, 1980
 Anarta Ochsenheimer, 1816
 Anartomorpha Alphéraky, 1892
 Antha Staudinger, 1892
 Apospasta Fletcher D.S., 1959
 Aspidifrontia Hampson, 1902
 Bambusiphila Sugi, 1958
 Brithysana Viette, 1963
 Calpiformis Hampson, 1908
 Campydelta Berio, 1964
 Capillamentum Pinhey, 1956
 Caradjia Zerny, 1928
 Cardepia Hampson, 1905
 Catamecia Staudinger, 1898
 Catasema Staudinger, 1888
 Centrochlora Dyar, 1912
 Ceramica Guenée, 1852
 Chabuata Walker, 1858
 Chandata Moore, 1882
 Chlorognesia Warren, 1913
 Cirrodes Hampson, 1910
 Clavipalpula Staudinger, 1892
 Clemathada Beck, 1996
 Closteromorpha R.Felder, 1874
 Cnodifrontia Hampson, 1902
 Conicofrontia Hampson, 1902
 Conisania Hampson, 1905
 Copifrontia Hampson, 1905
 Coranarta Beck, 1991
 Cornutifera Varga & Ronkay, 1991
 Craterestra Hampson, 1905
 Crosia Dupont, 1910
 Ctenoceratoda Varga, 1992
 Cyclopera Hampson, 1908
 Cyptonychia Hampson, 1900
 Cytocanis Hampson, 1910
 Cytothymia Hampson, 1908
 Dargida Walker, 1856
 Dicerogastra Fletcher D.S., 1961
 Dictyestra Sugi, 1982
 Dimorphicosmia Sugi, 1982
 Diparopsis Hampson, 1902
 Ebertidia Boursin, 1967
 Ectolopha Hampson, 1902
 Elyptron Saalmüller, 1891
 Enterpia Guenée, 1850
 Eremochroa Meyrick, 1897
 Escaria Grote, 1882
 Ethiopica Hampson, 1909
 Ethioterpia Hampson, 1910
 Eulymnia Hampson, 1908
 Euromoia Staudinger, 1892
 Eurypsyche Butler, 1886
 Euterpiodes Hampson, 1908
 Euxenistis Warren, 1910
 Feredayia Kirkaldy, 1910
 Goenycta Hampson, 1909
 Hada Billberg, 1820
 Hadena Schrank, 1802
 Hadenella Grote, 1883
 Haderonia Staudinger, 1895
 Haplocestra Aurivillius, 1910
 Hecatera Guenée, 1852
 Heterochroma Guenée, 1852
 Hypocalamia Hampson, 1910
 Hypoplexia Hampson, 1908
 Interdelta Berio, 1964
 Irene Saldaitis & Benedek, 2017
 Kisegira Hreblay & Ronkay, 1999
 Kollariana Hacker, 1996
 Lacanobia Billberg, 1820
 Leucapamea Sugi, 1982
 Lophotarsia Hampson, 1902
 Mamestra Ochsenheimer, 1816
 Mammifrontia Barnes & Lindsey, 1922
 Megaegira Ronkay, Ronkay, Gyulai & Hacker, 2010
 Melanchra Hübner, 1820
 Meliana Curtis, 1839
 Melionica Berio, 1970
 Mervia Daricheva, 1961
 Mesoplus Boursin, 1949
 Metopiora Meyrick, 1902
 Monostola Alphéraky, 1892
 Multisigna Varga, Ronkay & Ronkay, 2017
 Neopersectania Rodríguez & Angulo, 2007
 Neopistria Hampson, 1908
 Nereisana Strand, 1911
 Niaboma Nye, 1975
 Nyodes Laporte, 1971
 Odontestra Hampson, 1905
 Omphalestra Fletcher D.S., 1961
 Orthogonia Felder & Felder, 1862
 Pachetra Guenée, 1841
 Palponima Hampson, 1905
 Papestra Sukhareva, 1973
 Paracentropus Boursin, 1958
 Paracroria Hampson, 1908
 Polia Ochsenheimer, 1816
 Protomeceras Rebel, 1901
 Pseudamathes Rothschild, 1920
 Pseuderastria Hampson, 1908
 Pygmeopolia Hreblay & Ronkay, 1998
 Rhynchoplexia Hampson, 1908
 Rougeotia Laporte, 1974
 Saalmuellerana Fletcher & Viette, 1962
 Sajania A.G. Vologdin, 1962
 Sapporia Sugi, 1982
 Saragossa Staudinger, 1900
 Sarcopolia Sugi, 1982
 Sciomesa Tams & Bowden, 1953
 Scotogramma H. Edwards, 1887
 Scriptania Hampson, 1905
 Selenistis Hampson, 1908
 Sidemia Staudinger, 1892
 Sideridis Hübner, 1821
 Sparkia Nye, 1975
 Speia Tams & Bowden, 1953
 Spiramater McCabe, 1980
 Stauropides Hampson, 1908
 Stomafrontia Hampson, 1905
 Sugiella Özdikmen, 2008
 Syncalama Hampson, 1908
 Thargelia Püngeler, 1899
 Thyatirodes Hampson, 1909
 Thyrestra Hampson, 1905
 Trichanarta Hampson, 1896
 Trichestra Hampson, 1905
 Tricheurois Hampson, 1905
 Trichocosmia Grote, 1883
 Trichordestra McCabe, 1980
 Tridepia McDunnough, 1937
 Trudestra McDunnough, 1937
 Turanica Boursin, 1963
 Tycomarptes Fletcher D.S., 1961
 Vietteania Rungs, 1956
 Xanthiria Hampson, 1910
 Xantholepis Hampson, 1910
 Tribe Leucaniini Guenée, 1837
 Analetia Calora, 1966
 Leucania Ochsenheimer, 1816
 Mythimna Ochsenheimer, 1816
 Persectania Hampson, 1905
 Senta Stephens, 1834
 Tiracola Moore, 1881
 Tribe Noctuini Latreille, 1809
 Subtribe Agrotina Harris, 1841
 Actebia Stephens, 1829
 Agrotis Ochsenheimer, 1816
 Anicla Grote, 1874
 Basistriga Fibiger & Lafontaine, 1997
 Brachypteragrotis Viette, 1959
 Copablepharon Harvey, 1878
 Dichagyris Lederer, 1857
 Eucoptocnemis Grote, 1874
 Euxoa Hübner, 1821
 Feltia Walker, 1856
 Hemieuxoa McDunnough, 1929
 Himachalia Hacker & Peks, 1992
 Peridroma Hübner, 1821
 Protogygia McDunnough, 1929
 Richia Grote, 1887
 Striacosta Lafontaine, 2004
 Subtribe Axyliina Fibiger & Lafontaine, 2005
 Axylia Hübner, 1821
 Subtribe Noctuina Latreille, 1809
 Abagrotis Smith, 1890
 Adelphagrotis Smith, 1890
 Agnorisma Lafontaine, 1998
 Amazonides Fletcher D.S., 1961
 Anaplectoides McDunnough, 1929
 Aplectoides Butler, 1878
 Cerastis Ochsenheimer, 1816
 Chersotis Boisduval, 1840
 Choephora Grote & Robinson, 1868
 Coenophila Stephens, 1850
 Cryptocala Benjamin, 1921
 Cyrebia Guenée, 1852
 Diarsia Hübner, 1821
 Divaena Fibiger, 1993
 Epilecta Hübner, 1821
 Eueretagrotis Smith, 1890
 Eugnorisma Boursin, 1946
 Eugraphe Hübner, 1821
 Eurois Hübner, 1821
 Goniographa Varga & Ronkay, 2002
 Graphiphora Ochsenheimer, 1816
 Hemipachnobia McDunnough, 1929
 Hermonassa Walker, 1865
 Isochlora Staudinger, 1882
 Lycophotia Hübner, 1821
 Naenia Stephens, 1827
 Netrocerocora Bartel, 1903
 Noctua Linnaeus, 1758
 Ochropleura Hübner, 1821
 Parabagrotis Lafontaine, 1998
 Parabarrovia Gibson, 1920
 Paradiarsia McDunnough, 1929
 Prognorisma Lafontaine, 1998-01
 Pronoctua Smith, 1894
 Protolampra McDunnough, 1929
 Pseudohermonassa Varga, 1990
 Rhyacia Hübner, 1821
 Setagrotis Smith, 1890
 Spaelotis Boisduval, 1840
 Standfussiana Boursin, 1946
 Tesagrotis Lafontaine, 1998
 Xestia Hübner, 1818
 Not assigned to a subtribe
 Ammogrotis Staudinger, 1895
 Dimorphinoctua Viette, 1952
 Epipsilia Hübner, 1821
 Euxootera Fletcher, 1961
 Hyperfrontia Berio, 1962
 Miniphila Beck, 1996
 Neoparadigma Krüger, 2006
 Psectraxylia Fletcher D.S., 1961
 Sclereuxoa Berio, 1977
 Xylostola Hampson, 1909
 Tribe Orthosiini Guenée, 1837
 Acerra Grote, 1874
 Achatia Hübner, 1813
 Admetovis Grote, 1873
 Anorthoa Berio, 1980
 Crocigrapha Grote, 1875
 Dioszeghyana Hreblay, 1993
 Egira Duponchel, 1845
 Harutaeographa Yoshimoto, 1993
 Lithopolia Yoshimoto, 1993
 Morrisonia Grote, 1874
 Nepalopolia Ronkay, Ronkay, Gyulai & Hacker, 2010
 Orthimella Schmidt & Lafontaine, 2018
 Orthosia Ochsenheimer, 1816
 Panolis Hübner, 1821
 Perigonica Smith, 1890
 Perigrapha Lederer, 1857
 Protegira Ronkay, Ronkay, Gyulai & Hacker, 2010
 Stretchia H. Edwards, 1874
 Tribe Phlogophorini Hampson, 1918
 Checupa Moore, 1867
 Conservula Grote, 1874
 Euplexia Stephens, 1829
 Euplexidia Hampson, 1896
 Oroplexia Hampson, 1908
 Paradiopa Prout, 1928
 Pareuplexia Warren, 1911
 Phlogophora Treitschke, 1825
 Pseudenargia Boursin, 1956
 Yula Bethune-Baker, 1906
 Tribe Phosphilini Poole, 1995
 Acherdoa Walker, 1865
 Phosphila Hübner, 1818
 Phuphena Walker, 1858
 Speocropia Hampson, 1908
 Tribe Prodeniini Forbes, 1954
 Spodoptera Guenée, 1852
 Tribe Pseudeustrotiini Beck, 1996
 Anterastria Sugi, 1982
 Pseudeustrotia Warren, 1913
 Tribe Tholerini Beck, 1996
 Cerapteryx Curtis, 1833
 Nephelodes Guenée, 1852
 Tholera Hübner, 1821
 Tribe Xylenini Guenée, 1837
 Subtribe Antitypina Forbes & Franclemont, 1954
 Ammoconia Lederer, 1857
 Andropolia Grote, 1895
 Antitype Hübner, 1821
 Aporophyla Guenée, 1841
 Blepharita Hampson, 1907
 Dasypolia Guenée, 1852
 Dichonia Hübner, 1821
 Dryobota Lederer, 1857
 Dryobotodes Warren, 1911
 Dryotype Hampson, 1906
 Eumichtis Hübner, 1821
 Mniotype Franclemont, 1941
 Platypolia Grote, 1895
 Polymixis Hübner, 1820
 Pseudohadena Alpheraky, 1889
 Rhizagrotis Smith, 1890
 Scotochrosta Lederer, 1857
 Sutyna Todd, 1958
 Trigonophora Hübner, 1821
 Xylotype Hampson, 1906
 Subtribe Cosmiina Guenée, 1852
 Atethmia Hübner, 1821
 Chasminodes Hampson, 1910
 Cosmia Ochsenheimer, 1816
 Dicycla Guenée, 1852
 Enargia Hübner, 1821
 Ipimorpha Hübner, 1821
 Xanthocosmia Sugi, 1982
 Zotheca Grote, 1874
 Subtribe Ufeina Crumb, 1956
 Ufeus Grote, 1873
 Subtribe Xylenina Guenée, 1837
 Agrochola Hubner, 1821
 Agrocholorta
 Anathix Franclemont, 1937
 Aseptis McDunnough, 1937
 Brachylomia Hampson, 1906
 Chaetaglaea Franclemont, 1943
 Conistra Hübner, 1821
 Epidemas Smith, 1894
 Epiglaea Grote, 1878
 Eucirroedia Grote, 1875
 Eupsilia Hübner, 1821
 Hillia Grote, 1883
 Homoglaea Morrison, 1876
 Hyppa Duponchel, 1845
 Incertobole
 Jodia Hübner, 1818
 Lithophane Hübner, 1821
 Metaxaglaea Franclemont, 1937
 Orbona Hübner, 1821
 Paraseptis Mustelin & Crabo, 2015
 Psectraglaea Hampson, 1906
 Pyreferra Franclemont, 1937
 Sericaglaea Franclemont, 1941
 Suginistra
 Sunira Franclemont, 1950
 Sydiva Moore, 1882
 Telorta Warren, 1910
 Tiliacea Tutt, 1896
 Viridiseptis Mustelin & Crabo, 2015
 Vulpechola
 Xanthia Ochsenheimer, 1816
 Xylena Ochsenheimer, 1816
 Xystopeplus Franclemont, 1937
 Not assigned to a subtribe
 Agrotisia Hampson, 1908
 Ammopolia Boursin, 1955
 Antivaleria Sugi, 1980
 Apterogenum Berio, 2002
 Borbotana Walker, 1858
 Busseola Thurau, 1904
 Carelis Bowden, 1956
 Csorbatype Hreblay, Peregovits & Ronkay, 1999
 Etlorta Kononenko, 2016
 Fagitana Walker, 1865
 Feraxinia Moyal et al., 2010
 Fishia Grote, 1877
 Gyrospilara Kononenko, 1989
 Hemibryomima Barnes & Benjamin, 1927
 Hemiglaea Sugi, 1980
 Homoanarta Barnes & Benjamin, 1923
 Karana Moore, 1882
 Litholomia Grote, 1875
 Lithomoia Hübner, 1821
 Meristides Strand, 1909
 Mesogona Boisduval, 1840
 Metappana Viette, 1965
 Neostichtis Janse, 1937
 Niphonyx Sugi, 1982
 Orohadena Ronkay, Varga & Gyulai, 2002
 Pachypolia Grote, 1874
 Palaeagrotis Hampson, 1907
 Parastichtis Hübner, 1821
 Parvispinia Babics, Kononenko & Saldaitis, 2012
 Phoebophilus Staudinger, 1888
 Properigea Barnes & Benjamin, 1927
 Pseudanarta Grote, 1878
 Pseudanthoecia Smith, 1883
 Pseudobryomima Barnes & Benjamin, 1927
 Rhiza Staudinger, 1889
 Rhynchaglaea Hampson, 1906
 Selicanis Smith, 1900
 Solgaitiana Laporte, 1984
 Sugitania Matsumura, 1926
 Syrrusoides Laporte, 1972
 Teratoglaea Sugi, 1958
 Tracheplexia Janse, 1937
 Tumidifrontia Hampson, 1902
 Wiltshireola Hacker, 2001
 Xenotrachea Sugi, 1958
Not assigned to a tribe
 Acroriodes Hampson, 1909
 Amefrontia Hampson, 1899
 Anagnorisma Ronkay & Varga, 2000
 Andesia Hampson, 1906
 Apsarasa Moore, 1868
 Ariathisa Walker, 1865
 Bagada Walker, 1858
 Bathytricha Turner, 1920
 Benshirachia Gyulai, Varga & Ronkay, 2002
 Boursinia Brandt, 1938
 Brachytegma Berio, 1962
 Bryogramma Schaus, 1911
 Bryomoia Staudinger, 1892
 Bryoxena Varga, Ronkay & Hacker, 1990
 Buciara Walker, 1869
 Cassania Berio, 1972
 Chalconyx Sugi, 1982
 Clethrorasa Hampson, 1910
 Cosmodes Guenée, 1852
 Dallolmoia Berio, 1972
 Daseochaeta Warren, 1907
 Dasygaster Guenée, 1852
 Dipterygina Sugi, 1954
 Doerriesa Staudinger, 1900
 Ectopatria Hampson, 1903
 Effractilis Berio, 1977
 Haliophyle Warren, 1912
 Hoeneidia Boursin, 1954
 Hypernaenia Hampson, 1894
 Iambia Walker, 1863
 Ichneutica Meyrick, 1887
 Ikondiana Berio, 1972
 Leucocosmia Butler, 1886
 Lignispalta Holloway, 1989
 Mabilleana Fletcher & Viette, 1962
 Malotia Krüger, 2005
 Manga Bowden, 1956
 Matopo Distant, 1898
 Mentaxya Geyer, 1837
 Mesocrapex Matsumura, 1929
 Meterana Butler, 1877
 Micragrotis Hampson, 1903
 Mionides Hampson, 1902
 Mudaria Moore, 1893
 Myalila Strand, 1909
 Nacopa Barnes & Benjamin, 1924
 Neumichtis Hampson, 1906
 Neuranethes Bethune-Baker, 1911
 Neurois Hampson, 1903
 Nezonycta Varga & Ronkay, 1991
 Nivetica Hoare, 2019
 Ochrocalama Hampson, 1910
 Odontoretha Hampson, 1916
 Oenoptera Hampson, 1910
 Oligarcha Varga, Ronkay & Gyulai, 1995
 Opigena Boisduval, 1840
 Pachythrix Turner, 1942
 Pansemna Turner, 1920
 Paraxestia Hampson, 1903
 Pastona Walker, 1858
 Phalerodes Hampson, 1908
 Phoperigea Viette, 1965
 Physetica Meyrick, 1887
 Plantea Hacker & Ronkay, 1996
 Plusiophaes Prout, 1921
 Praina Schaus, 1898
 Procrateria Hampson, 1905
 Proteuxoa Hampson, 1903
 Protognorisma Ronkay & Varga, 2000
 Protomiselia Sugi, 1958
 Psaphara Walker, 1857
 Pseudoleucania Staudinger, 1899
 Ramesodes Hampson, 1908
 Satrapodes Hampson, 1910
 Schizognorisma Ronkay & Varga, 2000
 Sineugraphe Boursin, 1954
 Spinipalpa Alphéraky, 1892
 Syntheta Turner, 1902
 Turacina
 Xenophysa Boursin, 1969
 Xestioplexia Gyulai, 2015
 Xylopolia Sugi, 1982
 Yepcalphis Nye, 1975

References